Worldbinder is an epic fantasy novel by American writer David Farland, the  sixth book in his series The Runelords.  It is set in a land where men can bestow on each other a number of endowments, granting the recipient attributes such as increased strength, a more acute sense of hearing, or better eyesight.  The novel combines traditional sword and sorcery elements of fantasy with its own unique magic system of endowments.

Plot summary 
In this novel, the main character Fallion returns to Castle Coorm in Mystarria, following his defeat of Shadoath. There he finds The One True Tree reborn, but it is surrounded by a twisted Seal of the Inferno. Fallion tries to heal the rune, only to discover that it was a trap left by the Queen of the Loci, in the form of Shadoath. The only thing he can do to save himself is to combine his world with the other linked to the Seal of the Inferno. The two worlds crash together with some unexpected results. For example, some people who happen to be standing in the wrong place recover from the melding of the two worlds to discover that they have a vine growing through their hand. Others combine with the version of themselves from the other world to produce a hybrid, but those whose other self has died or was never born are weakened.

In this new world, a race of men who are several feet taller than the men from Fallion's world are locked in a mortal struggle with a race called wyrmlings. The wyrmlings are light-sensitive, and are approximate to the Inkharrans from Fallion's world and they carry parasitic wyrms inside them (like the loci of Fallion's world). They are led by Death Lords and Knights Eternal, undead creatures that perform the will of the Queen of the Loci. The battle between wyrmlings and men is at an uneasy truce because each holds a captive of the other race—the wyrmlings hold the prince Areth (the equivalent of Fallion's father, Gaborn, the Earth King) and the men hold the princess of the wyrmlings, Kan-hazur.

Even though the Knights Eternal are rumored to be impossible to slay except in daylight, Fallion and Jaz manage to kill one before they are taken captive by one named Vulgnash. This earns them the respect of the warrior men of that world. Those men, led by High King Urstone (who is the equivalent of Fallion's grandfather on this world), mount a rescue of Fallion and his companions.

The legendary Daylan Hammer is present on this new world and he convinces the King to try to exchange hostages with the wyrmlings because it is immoral to keep the princess hostage. The wyrmlings pretend to make the exchange and then ambush the men. This is followed by an all-out attack on the main fortress of the men, Caer Luciare. During this battle the High King is slain, as well as Jaz, and Fallion is again taken by the Knight Eternal, Vulgnash. The wyrmlings make a deal with Prince Areth to spare his people if he'll accept a wyrm. The Queen of the Loci accepts him as her host and then he uses his new power as Earth King to Choose all of the wyrmling horde for the (twisted) Earth.

Main characters
Fallion: Gaborn Val Orden's oldest son, an immortal (Bright One) flameweaver known as the Torchbearer.
Jaz: Fallion's younger brother and an accomplished archer
Rhianna: A young woman who is in love with Fallion.
Talon: Daughter of Sir Borenson and Lady Myrrima.
High King Urstone: The shadow world equivalent of Fallion's grandfather
Prince Areth Urstone: The shadow world equivalent of Fallion's father, Gaborn val Orden, and the Earth King
Wizard Sisel: The shadow world equivalent of the Wizard Binnesman
Emir of Dalharristan: The shadow world equivalent of Raj Ahten
Siyaddah: The Emir's stunningly beautiful daughter who catches Fallion's eye
Lord Madoc: A ruthless warlord who conspires against King Urstone
Drewish and Connor: Lord Madoc's scheming sons
Alun: Master of the Dogs who becomes an unlikely hero during the battles with the wyrmlings
Vulgnash: Leader of the undead Knights Eternal
Daylan Hammer: A legendary immortal (Bright One) who keeps watch over several shadow worlds
Emperor Zul-torac: Leader of the wyrmlings
Princess Kan-hazur: Daughter of Zul-torac, princess of the wyrmlings
Lady Despair/Queen of the Loci/Yaleen: Fallion's enemy, the immortal who shattered the One True World

American fantasy novels
2007 American novels
Runelords series
Tor Books books